Monocotylidae is a family of monogenean flatworms.

Genera
 Anoplocotyloides
 Calicotyle
 Cathariotrema
 Clemacotyle
 Dasybatotrema
 Decacotyle
 Dendromonocotyle
 Dictyocotyle
 Empruthotrema
 Euzetia
 Heliocotyle
 Heterocotyle
 Holocephalocotyle 
 Mehracotyle 
 Merizocotyle
 Monocotyle
 Mycteronastes
 Myliocotyle 
 Neoheterocotyle
 Papillocotyle
 Septesinus
 Spinuris
 Squalotrema
 Thaumatocotyle
 Triloculotrema

References

Monopisthocotylea
Platyhelminthes families